{{Infobox person
| name               = Cristina Goettsch Mittermeier
| image              = Cristina Mittermeier.jpg
| caption            = 
| birth_name         = Cristina Sofía Goettsch Cabello
| birth_date         = 
| birth_place        = Mexico City, Mexico
| death_date         = 
| death_place        = 
| body_discovered    = 
| death_cause        = 
| resting_place      = 
| resting_place_coordinates = 
| nationality        = Mexican, American
| citizenship        = American
| other_names        = 
| known_for          = Co-Founder & President of SeaLegacy & The Only One Collective, Founder and former presidentInternational League of Conservation Photographers & National Geographic contributing photographer.
| education          = Biochemical Engineer/Fisheries and Marine Biology
| alma_mater         = ITESM
| employer           = Self-employed
| occupation         = Photojournalist
| years_active       = 
| title              = 
| height             = 
| term               = 
| predecessor        = 
| successor          = 
| party              = 
| opponents          = 
| boards             = 
| spouse             = 
| partner            = Paul Nicklen
| children           = Michael Mittermeier, Juliana Mittermeier, John Mittermeier
| parents            = 
| relations          = 
| callsign           = 
| signature          = 
| website            = http://cristinamittermeier.com/
| footnotes          = 
}}
Cristina Goettsch Mittermeier (born Cristina Sofía Goettsch Cabello: November 26, 1966 in Mexico City, Mexico) is a Mexican photographer, conservationist, biologist, and author.

Cristina Mittermeier is the marine biologist and activist who pioneered the concept and field of conservation photography. Mittermeier founded the International League of Conservation Photographers (ILCP) in 2005 to provide a platform for photographers working on environmental issues. In 2014, Mittermeier co-founded SeaLegacy, a non-profit organization dedicated to the protection of the ocean. SeaLegacy is a global network of storytellers who use their art and expertise in media and communications to fuel a community focused on restoring the ocean's health and abundance. In 2020, on the fiftieth anniversary of Earth Day, Mittermeier announced the most ambitious project of her career: Only One, a new digital technology product that amplifies stories, campaigns, and solutions that sit at the intersection of ocean health and social justice and uses the power of media and technology to inspire individuals to take action to rebuild ocean life. Mittermeier is a Sony Artisan of Imagery and was named one of National Geographic's Adventurers of the Year in 2018. She is also the recipient of many awards, including the Mission Award from the North American Nature Photography Association, the Smithsonian Conservation Photographer of the Year Award, and the Imaging Award for Photographers Who Give Back. Mittermeier received the 2020/2021 Humanity Photography Content Creator Award from HIPA. In recognition of her three decades of courageous journalism and making the pictures that tell the story of our planet, Mittermeier was presented with the 2021 Seattle Aquarium Sylvia Earle Medal and is the recipient of Travel + Leisure's Global Vision Award for 2021.

Biography
Mittermeier received her undergraduate degree in marine biology from the Instituto Tecnologico y de Estudios Superiores de Monterrey, (ITESM) in Guaymas, Sonora, Mexico in 1989.  She married Dr. Russell Mittermeier in 1991 and the two of them moved to Great Falls, Virginia. It is with him that she has coauthored several books. Prior to becoming a professional photographer, she conducted fieldwork in the Gulf of California and the Yucatan Peninsula in subjects including marine mammals, fisheries, aquaculture, biodiversity research and conservation, resulting in publications in scientific journals.

Mittermeier studied photography at the Corcoran College for the Arts in Washington, D.C. (no degree).  Her images focus on demonstrating the important relationship between human cultures, especially indigenous people and biodiversity, the ocean and climate change.

In 2005, Mittermeier created the International League of Conservation Photographers (ILCP), and in 2011 resigned from her position as the organization's President. She sits on the board of directors of the WILD Foundation,  and the Chairman's Council of Conservation International (her ex-husband's organization).  Mittermeier also photographed, and was integral to the deliberations of, the Defying Ocean's End Conference (Los Cabos, Mexico 2003), working closely with Dr. Sylvia Earle.

In 2008, she was named one of Sony's Artisans of Imagery.

In 2014, Mittermeier, together with photographer and partner Paul Nicklen, co-founded SeaLegacy, an organization that uses visual storytelling and photography to further the cause of ocean conservation and has developed into a production studio featuring some of the world's best environmental storytellers, photographers and filmmakers.

In 2020, Mittermeier co-founded the  Only One Collective, a new organization that brings together a diverse, worldwide community of activists and experts to fuel action on ocean conservation. The Collective includes SeaLegacy, an expedition and storytelling studio that creates powerful visual content to move people from apathy to action, and Only.One, a digital action platform built to support and uplift the ocean conservation community while driving action to achieve measurable, sustainable and equitable returns for people and the ocean.

Books
Cristina  Mittermeier has edited or coauthored twenty-seven books, including the CEMEX Conservation Book Series.

Amaze , A Fine Art coffee table book combining two series: "Enoughness" and "The Water's Edge". Published by TeNeues, 2018.
Hotspots: Earth's Biologically Richest and Most Endangered Terrestrial Ecoregions, 1999. Conservation International, Washington, DC
 Megadiversity: Earths Biologically Wealthiest Nations, 1997. CEMEX, Mexico
Wildlife Spectacles
Hotspots Revisited: Earth's Biologically Richest and Most Endangered Terrestrial Ecoregions, 2005.  Conservation International, with a Foreword by Harrison Ford and Ed Wilson.
Wilderness Areas: Earth's Last Wild Places, 2003. Conservation International, Washington, DC
TransboundaryConservation: A New Vision for Protected Areas, 2005. Conservation International, Washington, DC
The Human Footprint: Challenges for Wilderness and Biodiversity, 2006. CEMEX, Conservation International, International League of Conservation Photographers. Mexico
A Climate for Life, Facing the Global Challenge, 2008.CEMEX, Conservation International, International League of Conservation Photographers. Mexico
The Wealth of Nature, 2009. CEMEX, Conservation International, International League of Conservation Photographers. Mexico
Freshwater; the Essence of Life, 2010. CEMEX, Conservation International, International League of Conservation Photographers.
Sublime Nature: Photographs That Awe and Inspire, 2014 National Geographic.

Her first monograph, Amaze'', was published by teNeues in 2018.

Awards
Nature's Best Conservation Photographer of the Year 2010

Member of the World Photographic Academy

North American Nature Photography Association (NANPA) 2010 Mission Award

2021 Seattle Aquarium Sylvia Earle Medal

See also
 Conservation photography
 Nature photography
 Wildlife photography

References

External links
Photographer's website
ILCP website
Kayapó Indigenous Nation 
Nature Journal experts 

Mexican photographers
Living people
Monterrey Institute of Technology and Higher Education alumni
Marine fauna researchers of the Gulf of California
People from Mexico City
1966 births
Mexican women photographers
People from Great Falls, Virginia